Phaya Mengrai is a district (amphoe) of Chiang Rai province, northern Thailand.

Geography
Neighboring districts are (from the west clockwise): Wiang Chai, Wiang Chiang Rung, Chiang Khong, Khun Tan and Thoeng of Chiang Rai Province.

History
The minor district (king amphoe) was created on 5 May 1981, when the three tambons Mae Pao, Mae Tam, and Mai Ya were split off from Thoeng district. It was upgraded to a full district on 12 August 1987.

Etymology
The district is named after King Mengrai, the founder of the Lanna kingdom of northern Thailand.

Economy
Tambon Phay Mengrai is the site of a 2,700 rai Cavindish banana plantation owned and operated by the Chinese firm, Hongta International, a major local employer. The Cavendish banana is controversial as its cultivation requires the intensive use of chemical pesticides to yield harvests for export. The Mekong-Lanna nature conservation network has accused the Chinese plantation of heavy use of pesticides and excessive water takings from Mae Ing Creek. These charges are as yet unsubstantiated (2016).

Administration
The district is divided into five sub-districts (tambons), which are further subdivided into 69 villages (mubans). Phaya Mengrai is a township (thesaban tambon) which covers parts of tambons Mengrai and Mae Pao. There are a further five tambon administrative organizations (TAO).

References

External links

amphoe.com

Phaya Mengrai